Singer 2017 was the fifth season of Chinese television series of the rebranded version of I Am a Singer. Due to the banning of Korean-related brands and artists in China, the series went with a rebranding under a simplified title of Singer, but otherwise retained similar competition format from the past four seasons of I Am a Singer. This is the only season in which no singers doubled their roles as the hosts, and He Jiong, who hosted the finale after a year's absence, served as the host.

The fifth season premiered on January 21, 2017, on Hunan Television, and ended on April 22, 2017. Hong Kong singer Sandy Lam was named the winner of the season, Kazakhstan's Dimash Kudaibergen and Taiwanese band Lion were named runner-up and third place, respectively.

Competition rules
In spite of the renaming of the show, the format was otherwise similar from previous seasons of I Am a Singer. As seen in the last season, the competing singers performed on stage and the 500-member audience panel voted, deciding the outcome of the results. At the end of each Knockout round, the singer with the fewest votes combined from both Qualifier and Knockouts was eliminated.

The Challenge round twist first seen in the third season, also returned with a modification with two singers (one Challenger and one Returning Singer from previous seasons) entering the competition. As in the previous series, in order to be safe, challengers, but not returning singers, had to beat a majority of singers by ranking in the top four or better, while the results from the Challenge rounds were counted individually.

This is the only season to have an increased number of finalists (ten), and the first season to feature returning singers from previous seasons. This was the last season to feature Singer voting which was introduced in Season 3.

Contestants
The following singers participated in Singer 2017 are listed in alphabetical order (singers without a placement for the final are listed as finalists; singers eliminated before the finals are listed as non-finalists; singers who withdrew are listed as withdrawn):

Key:
 – Winner
 – Runner-up
 – Third place
 – Other finalist
 – Withdrew
 – Withdrew (Initially eligible for Breakout round but did not participate)

New singers

Returning singers
This is the first season to feature former I Am a Singer contestants returning to the competition. All four singers were given Substitute Singer status and entered the competition on the start of their respective Challenge round.

Future appearances
Dimash Kudaibergen, Lion, Tia Ray and Diamond Zhang returned as guest singers for the Biennial concert on season six. Tia Ray and Kudaibergen appeared as guest assistant singers during the finals for season seven. Ray and Jam Hsiao (of the Lion band) returned as contestants on the eighth season.

Outside Singer, Kudaibergen also appeared in CBS's reality competition The World's Best in 2019 where he withdrew after the Top 12 rounds.

Results

{| class="wikitable" style="margin:1em auto; text-align:center; font-size:100%"
|+
|-
! rowspan="4" width="2" | !! rowspan="4" width="250" |Singer !! colspan="14" | Broadcast Date (2017)
|-
! Jan 21 !! Jan 28 !! | Feb 4 !!  Feb 11 
!Feb 18!! Feb 25 !! | Mar 4 
! Mar 11 !! Mar 18  !!  Mar 25
!Apr 1!! Apr 8 !! colspan=2| Apr 15 
|-
! colspan="2" |1st Round
! colspan="2" |2nd Round
! colspan="2" |3rd Round
! colspan="2" |4th Round
! colspan="2" |5th Round
! rowspan="2" |Breakout
! rowspan="2" |Semifinal
! colspan="2" |Final Round
|-
! width="70" data-sort-type="text" |Qualifying !! width="70" data-sort-type="text" |Knockout !! width="70" data-sort-type="text|Challenge !! width="70" data-sort-type="text" |Knockout !!  width="70" data-sort-type="text" |Challenge !! width="70" data-sort-type="text" |Knockout !!  width="70" data-sort-type="text" |Qualifying !! width="70" data-sort-type="text" |Knockout !!  width="70" data-sort-type="text" |Challenge !! width="70" data-sort-type="text" |Knockout !! width="70" data-sort-type="text" |Finals !! width="70" data-sort-type="text" |Overall
|-
| 1
| Sandy Lam
| style="background: pink; color: black"| 2
| style="background: pink; color: black"| 3
| style="background: pink; color: black"| 6
| style="background: pink; color: black"| 2
| style="background: pink; color: black"| 2
| style="background: pink; color: black"| 3
| style="background: blue; color: white"| 1 
| style="background: pink; color: black"| 4
| style="background: pink; color: black"| 5
| style="background: blue; color: white"| 1 
| style="background: pink; color: black"| —
| style="background: blue; color: white"| 1 
| style="background: blue; color: white"| 1 
| style="background: lime; color: black"| 1 
|-
| 2
| Dimash Kudaibergen
| style="background: blue; color: white" | 1
| style="background: blue; color: white" | 1
| style="background: pink; color: black" | 3
| style="background: pink; color: black" | 3
| style="background: pink; color: black" | 6
| style="background: blue; color: white" | 1
| style="background: pink; color: black" | 3
| style="background: pink; color: black" | 5
| style="background: pink; color: black"| 2
| style="background: pink; color: black"| 3
| style="background: pink; color: black" | —
| style="background: pink; color: black"| 2
| style="background: pink; color: black"| 2
| style="background: yellow; color: black"| 2 
|-
| 3
| Lion
| style="background: pink; color: black" | 4
| style="background: pink; color: black" | 4
| style="background: pink; color: black" | 5
| style="background: blue; color: white" | 1
| style="background: pink; color: black" | 7
| style="background: pink; color: black" | 5
| style="background: pink; color: black" data-sort-value="5"| 4
| style="background: pink; color: black" | 3
| style="background: pink; color: black" | 3
| style="background: pink; color: black" | 5
| style="background: pink; color: black" | —
| style="background: pink; color: black"| 5
| style="background: pink; color: black" | 3
| style="background: yellow; color: black"| 3 
|-
| 4
|  Li Jian
| —
| —
| —
| —
| —
| —
| style="background: pink; color: black" | 2
| style="background: pink; color: black" | 2
| style="background: pink; color: black"| 4
| style="background: pink; color: black"| 4
| style="background:#C697F3; color: black"| 1
| style="background: pink; color: black"| 4
| style="background: pink; color: black"| 4
| style="background: yellow; color: black"| 4
|-
| 5
|  Terry Lin
| —
| —
| —
| —
| style="background: pink; color: black" | 4
| style="background: pink; color: black" | 4
| style="background: pink; color: black" data-sort-value="6"| 5
| style="background: blue; color: white" | 1
| style="background: blue; color: white" | 1
| style="background: red; color: white" | 7
| style="background:#C697F3;  color: black"| 3
| style="background: pink; color: black"| 3
| style="background: pink; color: black"| 5
| style="background: yellow; color: black"| 5
|-
| 6
| Diamond Zhang
| —
| —
| —
| —
| —
| —
| style="background: red; color: white" data-sort-value="8"| 7 
| style="background: grey; color: white" | 7
| style="background: #F89B40; color: black" | —
| style="background: grey; color: white" | —
| style="background:#C697F3; color: black"| 5
| style="background: pink; color: black"| 6
| style="background: pink; color: black"| 6
| style="background: yellow; color: black"| 6
|-
| 7
| Tia Ray
| style="background: red; color: white" data-sort-value="8"| 7
| style="background: pink; color: black" | 6
| style="background: grey; color: white" | 8
| style="background: #F89B40; color: black" | —
| style="background: grey; color: white" | —
| style="background: grey; color: white" | —
| style="background: grey; color: white" | —
| style="background: grey; color: white" | —
| style="background: grey; color: white" data-sort-value="12"| —
| style="background: grey; color: white" | —
| style="background:#C697F3; color: black"| 6
| style="background: pink; color: black"| 7
| style="background: red; color: white"| 8
| style="background: yellow; color: black"| 7
|-
| 8
|  Jason Zhang
| —
| —
| style="background: pink; color: black"| 4
| style="background: pink; color: black"| 5
| style="background: pink; color: black"| 3
| style="background: pink; color: black"| 6
| style="background: pink; color: black" data-sort-value="7"| 6
| style="background: pink; color: black"| 6
| style="background: red; color: white"| 8
| style="background: pink; color: black"| 2
| style="background:#C697F3; color: black"| 4
| style="background: pink; color: black"| 8
| style="background: pink; color: black"| 7
| style="background: yellow; color: black"| 8
|-
| =9
| Teresa Carpio
| style="background: pink; color: black" | 3
| style="background: pink; color: black" | 5
| style="background: pink; color: black" | 7
|  style="background: grey; color: white" | 4
| style="background:#F89B40; color: black" | —
| style="background: grey; color: white" | —
| style="background: grey; color: white" | —
| style="background: grey; color: white" data-sort-value="11"| —
| style="background: grey; color: white" | —
| style="background: grey; color: white" | —
| style="background:#C697F3;  color: black" data-sort-value="2"| 2
| style="background: grey; color: white" data-sort-value="9"| —
| style="background: #F89B40; color: black" | —
| style="background: grey; color: white" | —
|-
| =9
|  Julia Peng
| —
| —
| —
| —
| —
| —
| —
| data-sort-value="15"| —
| style="background: pink; color: black"| 7
| style="background: grey; color: white"| 6
| style="background:#C697F3;  color: black"| 6
| style="background: grey;  color: white" data-sort-value="10"| —
| style="background: #F89B40; color: black"| —
| style="background: grey;  color: white" data-sort-value="10"| —
|-
| =11
| style="background:#92D3DA; color: black" | Liang Bo
| —
| —
| —
| —
| —
| —
| —
| data-sort-value="16"| —
| style="background: tan; color: black"| 6
| style="background: #F89B40; color: black"| —
| style="background:#7FFFD4; color: black"| 8
| style="background: grey; color: white" data-sort-value="11"| —
| style="background: grey; color: white"| —
| style="background: grey; color: white" | —
|-
| =11
| Michael Wong
| style="background: pink; color: black" | 6
|  style="background: grey; color: white" | 7
| style="background: #F89B40; color: black" | —
| style="background: grey; color: white" | —
| style="background: grey; color: white" | —
| style="background: grey; color: white" | —
| style="background: grey; color: white" | —
| style="background: grey; color: white" data-sort-value="13"| —
| style="background: grey; color: white" | —
| style="background: grey; color: white" | —
| style="background:#7FFFD4; color: black"| 9
| style="background: grey;color: white"| —
| style="background: grey; color: white"| —
| style="background: grey; color: white" | —
|-
| =11
| style="background:#92D3DA; color: black"| Justin Lo
| —
| —
| —
| —
| style="background:#994299; color: white"| 4 
|  style="background: grey; color: white"| 7
| style="background: #F89B40; color: black"| —
| style="background: grey; color: white"| —
| style="background: grey; color: white" data-sort-value="9"| —
| style="background: grey; color: white"| —
| style="background:#7FFFD4; color: black" data-sort-value="10"| 10
| style="background: grey;color: white"| —
| style="background: grey;color: white"| —
| style="background: grey; color: white" | —
|-
| =11
| style="background:#92D3DA; color: black" | Zhao Lei
| —
| —
| style="background:#994299; color: white" | 2
| style="background: red; color: white" | 7
| style="background: grey; color: white" | 8
| style="background: #F89B40; color: black" | —
| style="background: grey; color: white" | —
| style="background: grey; color: white" | —
| style="background: grey; color: white" data-sort-value="10"| —
| style="background: grey; color: white" | —
| style="background: black; color: white"| —
| style="background: black; color: white" data-sort-value="14"| —
| style="background: black; color: white"| —
| style="background: black; color: white"| —
|-
| =11
| Tan Jing
| style="background: pink; color: black"| 5
| style="background: pink; color: black"| 2
| style="background: blue; color: white"| 1
| style="background: pink; color: black"| 6
| style="background: blue; color: white"| 1
| style="background: pink; color: grey"| 2
| style="background: pink; color: grey"| 4
| style="background: black; color: white"| —
| style="background: black; color: white" data-sort-value="8"| —
| style="background: black; color: white"| —
| style="background: black; color: white"| —
| style="background: black; color: white" data-sort-value="15"| —
| style="background: black; color: white"| —
| style="background: black; color: white"| —
|-
| =11
| Hins Cheung
| style="background: pink; color: grey" data-sort-value="7"| 7
| style="background: black; color: white"| —
| style="background: black; color: white"| —
| style="background: black; color: white"| —
| style="background: black; color: white"| —
| style="background: black; color: white"| —
| style="background: black; color: white"| —
| style="background: black; color: white" data-sort-value="14"| —
| style="background: black; color: white"| —
| style="background: black; color: white"| —
| style="background: black; color: white"| —
| style="background: black; color: white" data-sort-value="16"| —
| style="background: black; color: white"| —
| style="background: black; color: white"| —
|-
|}

Details of competitions
Note: The  colour items mean it don't appear in the broadcast version.

First round

Qualifying
Taping Date: January 10, 2017
Airdate: January 21, 2017

The order of performance for this episode was determined through audience voting for their anticipated songs; singers may discuss their re-arrangement of performance order, which was reflected in the table. As there were eight first-round singers, the first round featured elimination for the singer who receive the fewest votes.

Tia Ray would have been eliminated for finishing last; however, Ray was later declared safe following Hins Cheung's sudden withdrawal; Cheung was later revealed to have participated in the political Umbrella Movement in Hong Kong after the episode was taped. Cheung's appearance (with the exclusion of a shot with him and Teresa Carpio) and performance were unaired and edited out of broadcast.

 a. Hins Cheung withdrew from Singer 2017 prior to the episode's airing. Cheung was ranked seventh, but his performance was excluded from the tally. Footage of his performance was edited out from the episode re-runs and in video-sharing websites as well.

Knockout
Taping Date: January 20, 2017
Airdate: January 28, 2017

Overall ranking

Second round

Challenge
Taping Date: January 21, 2017
Airdate: February 4, 2017 
The first returning singer was Jason Zhang from Season 2, while the first challenger of the season was Zhao Lei.

Knockout
Taping Date: February 2, 2017
Airdate: February 11, 2017

Overall ranking

Third round

Challenge
Taping Date: February 9, 2017
Airdate: February 18, 2017
The second returning singer was Terry Lin from Season 1, while the second challenger of the season was Justin Lo.

Knockout
Taping Date: February 16, 2017
Airdate: February 25, 2017

Overall ranking
Tan withdrew from the competition after the Knockout episode aired, and results of her scores were displayed in grey text.

Fourth round

Qualifying
Taping Date: February 23, 2017
Airdate: March 4, 2017
The third returning singer was Li Jian from Season 3, while the third challenger of the season was Diamond Zhang. 

Two days after the episode was taped, Tan announced her withdrawal from the competition, and footage of Tan's performances for this episode were edited out in broadcast due to privacy. Due to the sudden withdrawal, the rules of this round was changed to a Qualifying round, and consequently Diamond was declared safe after being initially eliminated for failing the challenge as she finished last this round.

Knockout
Taping Date: March 2, 2017
Airdate: March 11, 2017

Overall ranking

Fifth round

Challenge
Taping Date: March 9, 2017
Airdate: March 18, 2017 
The fourth and final returning singer was Julia Peng from Season 1, while the fourth and final challenger of the season was Liang Bo. Jason Zhang would have been eliminated for finishing last, however, Bo was unsuccessful in his challenge (finished 6th) and was eliminated instead.

Knockout
Taping Date: March 16, 2017
Airdate: March 25, 2017

Overall ranking

Breakout
Taping Date: March 23, 2017
Airdate: April 1, 2017
Three of the six singers who were initial singers (Lam, Lion and Kudaibergen) were exempt for this round, while the other three singers (with the exception of Cheung, Tan and Lei; Lei was however eligible but unable to take part due to scheduling conflicts on his concert) participated with eliminated singers for a chance to enter the semi-finals. The order was decided on ballot, with the exception of surviving non-initial singers (Li, Lin and Jason) who could choose their performance order for the night without ballot.

For the first time, the number of finalists was increased from seven to ten, thus seven Breakout spots were offered, and the top seven singers receiving the highest number of votes advanced to the semi-finals.

Total percentages of votes

Semi-finals
Taping Date: March 30, 2017
Airdate: April 8, 2017  
The semi-finals featured double elimination, and the two singers receiving the fewest votes were eliminated. For this round, singers went with a ballot with the singer who performed last going first. After the performance, the singer then choose a second singer to perform next among the remaining nine singers until only six singers remain, after which another ballot will take place and chooses the next four singers performing next in order, followed by a third ballot for the final two singers who draw first and last.

Finals
Airdate: April 15, 2017  
During the finals, each singer invited a musical guest to perform with him or her on the first song. The winner was determined based on the combined number of votes accumulated during the semi-finals and the finals.

Overall ranking (Winner of Battle)
Before the final results were announced, the host named Kudaibergen, Lion, Lam, and Li as "Ultimate Winner Candidates". Lam was declared as the winner of Singer 2017 with 22.74% of the combined votes cast.

  a. The percentage counting towards the total votes does not include votes cast from Carpio and Peng, who were eliminated at the semi-finals.

Biennial Concert
Airdate: April 22, 2017
The concert featured nine singers, which include Season 3 winner Han Hong, Season 4 winner Coco Lee, as well as the top seven singers Lam, Kudaibergen, Lion, Li, Lin, Diamond and Ray.

Ratings

|-style="background:#3399FF; font-weight:bold;"
| rowspan=2 | Episode
| rowspan=2 | Name
| rowspan=2 | Date
| rowspan=2 | Time
| colspan=3 | CSM52
| colspan=3 | CSM national network
|-style="background:#3399FF; font-weight:bold;"
| Rating
| Share
| Ranking
| Rating
| Share
| Ranking
|-
| colspan=10 | Legend: 
|-
| rowspan=2 | 1
| bgcolor=#FFFFE0 | The Singers
| rowspan=2 | 
| bgcolor=#FFFFE0 | 22:05:01－22:29:24
| bgcolor=#FFFFE0 | 1.547
| bgcolor=#FFFFE0 | 5.902
| bgcolor=#FFFFE0 | 2
| bgcolor=#FFFFE0 | 1.21
| bgcolor=#FFFFE0 | 5.44
| bgcolor=#FFFFE0 | 1
|-
| bgcolor=#FFE0E0 | Singer
| bgcolor=#FFE0E0 | 22:29:55－00:07:38
| bgcolor=#FFE0E0 | 1.324
| bgcolor=#FFE0E0 | 9.229
| bgcolor=#FFE0E0 | 4
| bgcolor=#FFE0E0 | 0.96
| bgcolor=#FFE0E0 | 7.92
| bgcolor=#FFE0E0 | 1
|-
| rowspan=2 | 2
| bgcolor=#FFFFE0 | The Singers
| rowspan=2 | 
| bgcolor=#FFFFE0 | 22:11:07－22:29:18
| bgcolor=#FFFFE0 | 1.239
| bgcolor=#FFFFE0 | 4.755
| bgcolor=#FFFFE0 | 4
| rowspan=2 | 1.0
| rowspan=2 | 7.46
| rowspan=2 | 1
|-
| bgcolor=#FFE0E0 | Singer
| bgcolor=#FFE0E0 | 22:29:49－00:13:33
| bgcolor=#FFE0E0 | 1.230
| bgcolor=#FFE0E0 | 7.694
| bgcolor=#FFE0E0 | 5
|-
| rowspan=2 | 3
| bgcolor=#FFFFE0 | The Singers
| rowspan=2 | 
| bgcolor=#FFFFE0 | 22:07:33－22:29:18
| bgcolor=#FFFFE0 | 1.493
| bgcolor=#FFFFE0 | 5.720
| bgcolor=#FFFFE0 | 2
| rowspan=2 | 0.87
| rowspan=2 | 7.45
| rowspan=2 | 1
|-
| bgcolor=#FFE0E0 | Singer
| bgcolor=#FFE0E0 | 22:29:49－00:25:20
| bgcolor=#FFE0E0 | 1.367
| bgcolor=#FFE0E0 | 9.861
| bgcolor=#FFE0E0 | 4
|-
| rowspan=2 | 4
| bgcolor=#FFFFE0 | The Singers
| rowspan=2 | 
| bgcolor=#FFFFE0 | 22:07:58－22:27:53
| bgcolor=#FFFFE0 | 1.388
| bgcolor=#FFFFE0 | 4.651
| bgcolor=#FFFFE0 | 4
| rowspan=2 | 1.12
| rowspan=2 | 7.6
| rowspan=2 | 1
|-
| bgcolor=#FFE0E0 | Singer
| bgcolor=#FFE0E0 | 22:28:23－00:17:40
| bgcolor=#FFE0E0 | 1.418
| bgcolor=#FFE0E0 | 8.818
| bgcolor=#FFE0E0 | 2
|-
| rowspan=3 | 5
| bgcolor=#FFFFE0 | The Singers
| rowspan=3 | 
| bgcolor=#FFFFE0 | 22:06:18－22:29:17
| bgcolor=#FFFFE0 | 1.359
| bgcolor=#FFFFE0 | 5.248
| bgcolor=#FFFFE0 | 6
| rowspan=3 | 0.95
| rowspan=3 | 8.06
| rowspan=3 | 1
|-
| bgcolor=#FFE0E0 | Singer
| bgcolor=#FFE0E0 | 22:29:48－23:51:59
| bgcolor=#FFE0E0 | 1.386
| bgcolor=#FFE0E0 | 9.062
| bgcolor=#FFE0E0 | 5
|-
| bgcolor=#FFE0E0 | Singer Announcement Period
| bgcolor=#FFE0E0 | 23:55:37－00:17:50
| bgcolor=#FFE0E0 | 0.778
| bgcolor=#FFE0E0 | 11.079
| bgcolor=#FFE0E0 | 9
|-
| rowspan=3 | 6
| bgcolor=#FFFFE0 | The Singers
| rowspan=3 | 
| bgcolor=#FFFFE0 | 22:13:09－22:29:18
| bgcolor=#FFFFE0 | 1.364
| bgcolor=#FFFFE0 | 5.387
| bgcolor=#FFFFE0 | 4
| rowspan=3 | —
| rowspan=3 | —
| rowspan=3 | —
|-
| bgcolor=#FFE0E0 | Singer
| bgcolor=#FFE0E0 | 22:29:48－23:35:10
| bgcolor=#FFE0E0 | 1.312
| bgcolor=#FFE0E0 | 7.863
| bgcolor=#FFE0E0 | 5
|-
| bgcolor=#FFE0E0 | Singer Announcement Period
| bgcolor=#FFE0E0 | 23:55:37－00:17:50
| bgcolor=#FFE0E0 | 0.837
| bgcolor=#FFE0E0 | 9.014
| bgcolor=#FFE0E0 | 10
|-
| rowspan=3 | 7
| bgcolor=#FFFFE0 | The Singers
| rowspan=3 | 
| bgcolor=#FFFFE0 | 22:10:12－22:29:18
| bgcolor=#FFFFE0 | 1.586
| bgcolor=#FFFFE0 | 6.331
| bgcolor=#FFFFE0 | 2
| bgcolor=#FFFFE0 | 1.12
| bgcolor=#FFFFE0 | 5.45
| bgcolor=#FFFFE0 | 1
|-
| bgcolor=#FFE0E0 | Singer
| bgcolor=#FFE0E0 | 22:29:49－23:48:04
| bgcolor=#FFE0E0 | 1.518
| bgcolor=#FFE0E0 | 9.725
| bgcolor=#FFE0E0 | 3
| bgcolor=#FFE0E0 | 0.88
| bgcolor=#FFE0E0 | 7.33
| bgcolor=#FFE0E0 | 1
|-
| bgcolor=#FFE0E0 | Singer Announcement Period
| bgcolor=#FFE0E0 | 23:52:25－00:08:23
| bgcolor=#FFE0E0 | 0.937
| bgcolor=#FFE0E0 | 11.625
| bgcolor=#FFE0E0 | 8
| bgcolor=#FFE0E0 | 0.44
| bgcolor=#FFE0E0 | 7.58
| bgcolor=#FFE0E0 | 1
|-
| rowspan=3 | 8
| bgcolor=#FFFFE0 | The Singers
| rowspan=3 | 
| bgcolor=#FFFFE0 | 22:09:48－22:29:18
| bgcolor=#FFFFE0 | 1.229
| bgcolor=#FFFFE0 | 4.882
| bgcolor=#FFFFE0 | 5
| bgcolor=#FFFFE0 | 1.05
| bgcolor=#FFFFE0 | 5.06
| bgcolor=#FFFFE0 | 1
|-
| bgcolor=#FFE0E0 | Singer
| bgcolor=#FFE0E0 | 22:29:49－23:44:41
| bgcolor=#FFE0E0 | 1.422
| bgcolor=#FFE0E0 | 9.137
| bgcolor=#FFE0E0 | 3
| bgcolor=#FFE0E0 | 0.94
| bgcolor=#FFE0E0 | 7.74
| bgcolor=#FFE0E0 | 1
|-
| bgcolor=#FFE0E0 | Singer Announcement Period
| bgcolor=#FFE0E0 | 23:50:00－00:07:30
| bgcolor=#FFE0E0 | 0.893
| bgcolor=#FFE0E0 | 11.596
| bgcolor=#FFE0E0 | 6
| bgcolor=#FFE0E0 | 0.46
| bgcolor=#FFE0E0 | 8.2
| bgcolor=#FFE0E0 | 1
|-
| rowspan=3 | 9
| bgcolor=#FFFFE0 | The Singers
| rowspan=3 | 
| bgcolor=#FFFFE0 | 22:10:30－22:29:17
| bgcolor=#FFFFE0 | 1.425
| bgcolor=#FFFFE0 | 5.647
| bgcolor=#FFFFE0 | 2
| rowspan=3 | —
| rowspan=3 | —
| rowspan=3 | —
|-
| bgcolor=#FFE0E0 | Singer
| bgcolor=#FFE0E0 | 22:29:48－23:58:56
| bgcolor=#FFE0E0 | 1.350
| bgcolor=#FFE0E0 | 9.110
| bgcolor=#FFE0E0 | 4
|-
| bgcolor=#FFE0E0 | Singer Announcement Period
| bgcolor=#FFE0E0 | 23:59:56－00:16:08
| bgcolor=#FFE0E0 | 0.847
| bgcolor=#FFE0E0 | 12.333
| bgcolor=#FFE0E0 | 8
|-
| rowspan=3 | 10
| bgcolor=#FFFFE0 | The Singers
| rowspan=3 | 
| bgcolor=#FFFFE0 | 22:09:48－22:29:18
| bgcolor=#FFFFE0 | 1.399
| bgcolor=#FFFFE0 | 5.719
| bgcolor=#FFFFE0 | 3
| bgcolor=#FFFFE0 | 1.12
| bgcolor=#FFFFE0 | 5.58
| bgcolor=#FFFFE0 | 1
|-
| bgcolor=#FFE0E0 | Singer
| bgcolor=#FFE0E0 | 22:29:49－23:42:14
| bgcolor=#FFE0E0 | 1.379
| bgcolor=#FFE0E0 | 8.913
| bgcolor=#FFE0E0 | 4
| bgcolor=#FFE0E0 | 0.81
| bgcolor=#FFE0E0 | 6.84
| bgcolor=#FFE0E0 | 1
|-
| bgcolor=#FFE0E0 | Singer Announcement Period
| bgcolor=#FFE0E0 | 23:46:20－00:10:52
| bgcolor=#FFE0E0 | 0.813
| bgcolor=#FFE0E0 | 10.453
| bgcolor=#FFE0E0 | 8
| bgcolor=#FFE0E0 | 0.36
| bgcolor=#FFE0E0 | 6.26
| bgcolor=#FFE0E0 | 1
|-
| rowspan=3 | 11
| bgcolor=#FFFFE0 | The Singers
| rowspan=3 | 
| bgcolor=#FFFFE0 | 22:10:49－22:29:18
| bgcolor=#FFFFE0 | 1.271
| bgcolor=#FFFFE0 | 5.268
| bgcolor=#FFFFE0 | 3
| bgcolor=#FFFFE0 | 0.97
| bgcolor=#FFFFE0 | 4.82
| bgcolor=#FFFFE0 | 1
|-
| bgcolor=#FFE0E0 | Singer
| bgcolor=#FFE0E0 | 22:29:49－23:48:46
| bgcolor=#FFE0E0 | 1.138
| bgcolor=#FFE0E0 | 7.732
| bgcolor=#FFE0E0 | 4
| bgcolor=#FFE0E0 | 0.68
| bgcolor=#FFE0E0 | 5.86
| bgcolor=#FFE0E0 | 1
|-
| bgcolor=#FFE0E0 | Singer Announcement Period
| bgcolor=#FFE0E0 | 23:53:33－00:10:27
| bgcolor=#FFE0E0 | 0.742
| bgcolor=#FFE0E0 | 10.316
| bgcolor=#FFE0E0 | 8
| bgcolor=#FFE0E0 | 0.29
| bgcolor=#FFE0E0 | 5.53
| bgcolor=#FFE0E0 | 1
|-
| rowspan=3 | 12
| bgcolor=#FFFFE0 | The Singers
| rowspan=3 | 
| bgcolor=#FFFFE0 | 22:09:58－22:29:21
| bgcolor=#FFFFE0 | 1.467
| bgcolor=#FFFFE0 | 5.973
| bgcolor=#FFFFE0 | 3
| bgcolor=#FFFFE0 | 1.05
| bgcolor=#FFFFE0 | 5.24
| bgcolor=#FFFFE0 | 1
|-
| bgcolor=#FFE0E0 | Singer
| bgcolor=#FFE0E0 | 22:29:52－23:53:38
| bgcolor=#FFE0E0 | 1.345
| bgcolor=#FFE0E0 | 9.019
| bgcolor=#FFE0E0 | 4
| bgcolor=#FFE0E0 | 0.77
| bgcolor=#FFE0E0 | 6.9
| bgcolor=#FFE0E0 | 1
|-
| bgcolor=#FFE0E0 | Singer Announcement Period
| bgcolor=#FFE0E0 | 23:57:28－00:12:54
| bgcolor=#FFE0E0 | 0.787
| bgcolor=#FFE0E0 | 10.722
| bgcolor=#FFE0E0 | 8
| bgcolor=#FFE0E0 | 0.34
| bgcolor=#FFE0E0 | 6.17
| bgcolor=#FFE0E0 | 1
|-
| rowspan=3 | 13
| bgcolor=#FFFFE0 | Countdown to Singer Finals
| rowspan=3 | 
| bgcolor=#FFFFE0 | 22:00:01－22:11:38
| bgcolor=#FFFFE0 | 1.467
| bgcolor=#FFFFE0 | 5.61
| bgcolor=#FFFFE0 | 5
| bgcolor=#FFFFE0 | 1.28
| bgcolor=#FFFFE0 | 5.64
| bgcolor=#FFFFE0 | 1
|-
| bgcolor=#FFE0E0 | Singer Finals
| bgcolor=#FFE0E0 | 22:11:38－00:01:30
| bgcolor=#FFE0E0 | 1.718
| bgcolor=#FFE0E0 | 10.94
| bgcolor=#FFE0E0 | 2
| bgcolor=#FFE0E0 | 1.28
| bgcolor=#FFE0E0 | 10.45
| bgcolor=#FFE0E0 | 1
|-
| bgcolor=#FFE0E0 | Singer Announcement Period
| bgcolor=#FFE0E0 | 00:05:35－00:27:30
| bgcolor=#FFE0E0 | 0.856
| bgcolor=#FFE0E0 | 13.88
| bgcolor=#FFE0E0 | 9
| bgcolor=#FFE0E0 | 0.52
| bgcolor=#FFE0E0 | 11.78
| bgcolor=#FFE0E0 | 1
|-
| rowspan=3 | 14
| bgcolor=#FFFFE0 | Countdown to Biennial Concert
| rowspan=3 | 
| bgcolor=#FFFFE0 | 22:00:00－22:10:14
| bgcolor=#FFFFE0 | 1.405
| bgcolor=#FFFFE0 | 5.36
| bgcolor=#FFFFE0 | 3
| bgcolor=#FFFFE0 | —
| bgcolor=#FFFFE0 | —
| bgcolor=#FFFFE0 | —
|-
| bgcolor=#FFE0E0 | Biennial Concert
| bgcolor=#FFE0E0 | 22:10:14－23:49:01
| bgcolor=#FFE0E0 | 1.058
| bgcolor=#FFE0E0 | 6.58
| bgcolor=#FFE0E0 | 6
| bgcolor=#FFE0E0 | 0.66
| bgcolor=#FFE0E0 | 5.11
| bgcolor=#FFE0E0 | 1
|-
| bgcolor=#FFE0E0 | Singer Announcement Period
| bgcolor=#FFE0E0 | No statistics
| bgcolor=#FFE0E0 | —
| bgcolor=#FFE0E0 | —
| bgcolor=#FFE0E0 | —
| bgcolor=#FFE0E0 | —
| bgcolor=#FFE0E0 | —
| bgcolor=#FFE0E0 | —

Notes

References

2017 Chinese television seasons
2017 in Chinese music
Chinese music television series
Singer (TV series)